The Blériot 71 was a large First World War French heavy night bomber designed and built by Blériot to the BN3 specification. Only a single prototype was built, which was damaged beyond repair on 15 May 1918.

Design and development
The Blériot 71 was a large equal-span biplane with a fuselage braced between the two wings and bearing a strong resemblance to the Blériot 67, (originally designed with the fuselage attached to the lower mainplane). Four  Hispano-Suiza 8B water-cooled V-8 engines were mounted as close to the centreline as possible, two on the upper wing leading edge and two on the lower wing. The biplane tail unit was originally designed with three fins, but eventually built with just two and the fixed conventional landing gear had four-wheel main units on struts and a tailskid. During flight testing the Bl 71 collided with a Breguet 14 B2 at Villacoublay on 15 May 1918, ending up in a ditch, damaged beyond repair.

Specifications

References

Notes

1910s French bomber aircraft
67
Four-engined tractor aircraft
Biplanes
Aircraft first flown in 1917
Four-engined piston aircraft